Gideon Schechtman (born 14 February 1947) is an Israeli mathematician and professor of mathematics at the Weizmann Institute of Science.

Academic career
Schechtman received his Ph.D. in mathematics from the Hebrew University of Jerusalem in 1976 and was a postdoctoral fellow at Ohio State University.

Since 1980 he has been affiliated with the Weizmann Institute, where he became emeritus professor in 2017. His research focuses predominantly on functional analysis and the geometry of Banach spaces. Schechtman is an editor of the Israel Journal of Mathematics.

References

1947 births
Functional analysts
Einstein Institute of Mathematics alumni
Israeli Jews
Israeli mathematicians
Academic staff of Weizmann Institute of Science
Living people